Andrei Yuryevich Fedkov (born 4 July 1971) is a Russian former football player.

Honours
 Russian Cup winner: 2004.
 Russian First Division top scorer: 2000 (26 goals), 2004 (38 goals). 38 goals was a record for most goals in one season of the Russian second-tier league until it was improved by Ivan Sergeyev in the 2020–21 season.
 Russian First Division best player: 2000, 2004.

International career
Fedkov made his debut for Russia in a 2002 FIFA World Cup qualifier against Yugoslavia. He was not selected for the World Cup squad.

References

External links 
 Player profile 

1971 births
Sportspeople from Rostov-on-Don
Living people
Soviet footballers
Russian footballers
Association football forwards
Russia international footballers
FC Rostov players
FC SKA Rostov-on-Don players
FC Kremin Kremenchuk players
FC Shakhtar Donetsk players
FC Shakhtar-2 Donetsk players
FC Arsenal Kyiv players
FC Baltika Kaliningrad players
FC Sokol Saratov players
FC Akhmat Grozny players
FC Sheksna Cherepovets players
Soviet First League players
Soviet Second League players
Soviet Second League B players
Russian Premier League players
Russian Second League players
Ukrainian Premier League players
Ukrainian First League players
Ukrainian Second League players
Russian First League players
Russian expatriate footballers
Expatriate footballers in Ukraine
Russian expatriate sportspeople in Ukraine
FC Spartak Moscow players